Sara Foster (born February 5, 1981) is an American actress. She is known for her role as Jen Clark on 90210. She was a fashion model before moving to the film industry.

Career
Foster guest-starred as herself on the HBO series Entourage, in which she had a romantic tryst with character Vincent Chase before appearing on Jimmy Kimmel Live! in the episode "Talk Show". She briefly hosted Entertainment Tonight spin-off ET on MTV in 2002. Based on that she was cast as the lead femme fatale in The Big Bounce, a remake of a movie adaptation of the same novel by Elmore Leonard. She has also appeared in the Backstreet Boys music video "Shape of My Heart", as well as music video for "Drop That Baby" by The Wondergirls.

In 2004, she played crime-fighting bisexual spy Amy in Angela Robinson's film D.E.B.S.. In 2009, she signed on to play Jen Clark, the sister of Naomi Clark, on The CW drama series 90210. Additionally, Foster starred in the 2010 science-fiction film Psych 9, which was directed by Andrew Shortell.

Personal life
Foster is the daughter of music producer David Foster and former model Rebecca Dyer. Since 2010, she has been engaged to tennis player Tommy Haas. They have two daughters, Valentina and Josephine.

Filmography

References

External links
 

1981 births
20th-century American actresses
21st-century American actresses
Actresses from Los Angeles
American film actresses
American infotainers
American television actresses
Living people